Best-Est is the first live album by Masami Okui, released on June 4, 1999.

Track listing

Disc 1

 OVA Girl from Phantasia theme song
 Lyrics: Satomi Arimori
 Composition, arrangement: Toshiyuki Watanabe

 Anime television Tanoshii Willow Town opening song
 Lyrics: Miho Matsuba
 Composition, arrangement: Osamu Tezuka
Reincarnation
 OVA Tekkaman Blade II opening song
 Lyrics: Satomi Arimori
 Composition: Takashi Kudo
 Arrangement: Toshiro Yabuki
My Jolly Days
 Anime film Ghost Sweeper Mikami ending song
 Lyrics: Keiko Kimoto
 Composition: Tsutomu Ohira
 Arrangement: Vink

 OVA Tekkaman Blade II ending song
 Lyrics: Satomi Arimori
 Composition: Takashi Kudo
 Arrangement: Toshiro Yabuki

 OVA Tekkaman Blade II ending song
 Lyrics: Satomi Arimori
 Composition: Takashi Kudo
 Arrangement: Toshiro Yabuki
Get along
 Masami Okui and Megumi Hayashibara
 Anime television Slayers opening song
 Lyrics: Satomi Arimori
 Composition: Hidetoshi Sato
 Arrangement: Tsutomu Ohira
Mask
 Masami Okui and Kasumi Matsumura
 Anime television Sorcerer Hunters ending song
 Lyrics, composition: Masami Okui
 Arrangement: Toshiro Yabuki, Tsutomu Ohira
Shake it
 OVA Starship Girl Yamamoto Yohko theme song
 Lyrics, composition: Masami Okui
 Arrangement: Toshiro Yabuki, Tsutomu Ohira

 Anime television Slayers Next ending song
 Lyrics: Masami Okui
 Composition: Masami Okui, Toshiro Yabuki
 Arrangement: Toshiro Yabuki
Naked Mind
 Radio drama Slayers N.EX opening song
 Lyrics: Masami Okui
 Composition, arrangement: Toshiro Yabuki
J
 OVA Jungle de Ikou! opening song
 Lyrics: Masami Okui
 Composition, arrangement: Toshiro Yabuki
spirit of the globe
 OVA Jungle de Ikou! ending song
 Lyrics, composition: Masami Okui
 Arrangement: Toshiro Yabuki

Disc 2

 Anime television Revolutionary Girl Utena opening song
 Lyrics: Masami Okui
 Composition, arrangement: Toshiro Yabuki
I can't... (a.c. version)
 Lyrics: Masami Okui
 Composition, arrangement: Toshiro Yabuki

 OVA Starship Girl Yamamoto Yohko opening song
 Lyrics: Masami Okui
 Composition, arrangement: Toshiro Yabuki
Birth
 Anime television Cyber Team in Akihabara opening song
 Lyrics: Masami Okui
 Composition: Masami Okui, Toshiro Yabuki
 Arrangement: Toshiro Yabuki

 Anime television Cyber Team in Akihabara ending song
 Lyrics, composition: Masami Okui
 Arrangement: Toshiro Yabuki

 Anime television Cyber Team in Akihabara soundtrack
 Lyrics: Masami Okui
 Composition, arrangement: Toshiro Yabuki

 Anime television Cyber Team in Akihabara soundtrack
 Lyrics: Masami Okui
 Composition, arrangement: Toshiro Yabuki
Never die
 OVA Slayers Excellent theme song
 Lyrics: Masami Okui
 Composition, arrangement: Toshiro Yabuki
Key
 Radio drama Cyber Team in Akihabara theme song
 Lyrics: Masami Okui
 Composition, arrangement: Toshiro Yabuki

 Lyrics: Masami Okui
 Composition, arrangement: Toshiro Yabuki

 Anime television Starship Girl Yamamoto Yohko opening song
 Lyrics: Masami Okui
 Composition, arrangement: Toshiro Yabuki

Sources
Official website: Makusonia

Masami Okui albums
1999 live albums